Amt Rosenberg (ARo, Rosenberg Office) was an official body for cultural policy and surveillance within the Nazi party, headed by Alfred Rosenberg. It was established in 1934 under the name of Dienststelle Rosenberg (DRbg, Rosenberg Department), with offices at Margarethenstraße 17 in Berlin, to the west of Potsdamer Platz.
Due to the long official name of Rosenberg's function, Beauftragter des Führers für die gesamte geistige und weltanschauliche Erziehung der NSDAP, the short description Reichsüberwachungsamt "Reich surveillance office" was used alongside, also shortened simply to Überwachungsamt "surveillance office".

In post-World War II historiography, "Amt Rosenberg" is also used in a wider sense as  a term for a number of official functions of Rosenberg which he held between 1928 and 1945. 
These included the Außenpolitisches Amt der NSDAP (APA "NSDAP Office of Foreign Affairs", including the Nordische Gesellschaft ("Nordic League")), Kampfbund für deutsche Kultur (KfdK "Militant League for German Culture"), NS-Kulturgemeinde ("NS-Cultural Community") (including the Kraft durch Freude ("Strength Through Joy") and  Deutsche Bühne ("German Stage") theatres),  Hohe Schule der NSDAP ("Advanced School of the NSDAP") and Einsatzstab Reichsleiter Rosenberg (ERR "Reichsleiter Rosenberg Taskforce"), an organisation devoted to acquiring and stealing art objects across the occupied territories of the Reich. 
Not included in the term as used by Bollmus (2007) is the Reichsministerium für die besetzten Ostgebiete (RMfdbO "Reich Ministry for the Occupied Eastern Territories"), because it was a government office, not a party office.

See also

Ahnenerbe
Ministry of Public Enlightenment and Propaganda
Nazi loot
Nazi propaganda
NSDAP Office of Colonial Policy
NSDAP Office of Foreign Affairs
NSDAP Office of Military Policy
NSDAP Office of Racial Policy

References 

 Reinhard Bollmus: Das Amt Rosenberg und seine Gegner. Studien zum Machtkampf im nationalsozialistischen Herrschaftssystem. Stuttgart 1970, DNB (2nd ed., München / Oldenbourg 2006, .)
 Raimund Baumgärtner: Weltanschauungskampf im Dritten Reich. Die Auseinandersetzung der Kirchen mit Alfred Rosenberg. Mainz 1977, .
 Michael H. Kater: Das Ahnenerbe der SS: 1933-1945. Ein Beitrag zur Kulturpolitik des Dritten Reiches. Stuttgart 1974. (4th ed., München 2005, .)
 George Leaman: Deutsche Philosophen und das »Amt Rosenberg«. In: Ilse Korotin (Hrsg.): »Die Besten Geister der Nation«. Philosophie und Nationalsozialismus, Vienna 1994, 41-65, .
 Jan-Pieter Barbian: Literaturpolitik im »Dritten Reich«. Institutionen, Kompetenzen, Betätigungsfelder, Nördlingen 1995, .

Nazi Party organizations
Nazi culture
Nazi propagandists